Kirsty Ogg (born 11 April 1967 Glasgow, Scotland) is currently Director of New Contemporaries and Lecturer in Curating at Goldsmiths, University of London. Previously, Ogg was a curator at the Whitechapel Gallery and Director of The Showroom. After studying Sculpture at Edinburgh College of Art, Ogg became involved with Transmission Gallery, Glasgow as part of the organising committee in the mid-1990s. Ogg is listed in the Artlyst Power 100 List for the art world.

References

Academics of University College London
Living people
British art curators
Cultural historians
British art critics
1967 births